The 2014 Taba bus bombing was a terrorist attack on a tourist coach in Taba, Egypt on 16 February 2014. The bus had been parked, waiting to cross into Israel at the Taba Border Crossing, when a lone suicide bomber entered the open bus and detonated his explosives. Four people – three South Koreans and the Egyptian bus driver were killed, and 17 others injured.

The attack was seen as marking a potential shift in the strategy of jihadist groups in the Sinai insurgency by broadening their campaign against Egyptian security forces to include tourists.

Victims
The bomber detonated his device on a tour bus carrying more than 30 members of a South Korean church group. They had traveled from Cairo to Saint Catherine's Monastery in the Sinai Peninsula. The bus was waiting to cross into Israel when the explosion occurred. The South Korean tourists belonged to the Jincheon Jungang Presbyterian Church. They had reportedly "saved for years to visit Biblical sites on the 60th anniversary of their church".

Responsibility
The day following the bombing, the Sinai-based jihadist group Ansar Bait al-Maqdis claimed responsibility for the attack in a statement released on jihadist forums. In the statement, Ansar declared, "One of the heroes of Ansar Beit al-Maqdis carried out the attack on a tourist bus heading towards the Zionist entity (Israel)." The group said the attack was "part of our economic war against this regime of traitors ... which kills the innocent, destroys houses, ransacks properties and lays waste to land on the border with the Zionist enemy".

On February 18, an affiliated Twitter account of Ansar told tourists to leave Egypt by February 20 or else they would be attacked.

Egyptian Islamist groups, including the Muslim Brotherhood, al-Gama'a al-Islamiyya and the National Alliance to Support Legitimacy, condemned the attack.

Impact
Issandr El Amrani of the International Crisis Group said, "A continuation in attacks on tourists would mean a shift in strategy by jihadist groups that until now targeted the military and police... but that cannot be judged after one attack".

Following the attack, many tourist operators cancelled trips to the Sinai. The tourism industry is a key sector of the Egyptian economy.

See also 
 October 2014 Sinai attacks
 January 2015 Sana'a bombing
 Sinai insurgency

References

Mass murder in 2014
Terrorist incidents in Egypt in 2014
Terrorist incidents in the Sinai Peninsula
Tourism in Egypt
Bus bombings in Asia
Suicide bombings in Egypt
Egypt–South Korea relations
Sinai insurgency
Attacks on tourists
South Sinai Governorate
2014 murders in Egypt